Rare Beasts is a 2019 British psychological romantic drama film written and directed by Billie Piper in her directorial debut. It stars Piper, Lily James, David Thewlis, Leo Bill, Kerry Fox and Toby Woolf.

Rare Beasts premiered at the Venice Film Festival on 31 August 2019, later receiving a simultaneous release in cinemas and digitally on 21 May 2021 in the UK.

Plot
An anti rom-com about Mandy, a career-driven nihilistic single mother with a deeply disturbed son, who falls in love with a borderline-incel, patriarchal man with rage issues named Pete.

Cast
 Billie Piper as Mandy
 Leo Bill as Pete
 David Thewlis as Vic
 Lily James as Cressida
 Kerry Fox as Marion
 Toby Woolf as Larch
 Jonjo O'Neill as Dougie
 Antonia Campbell-Hughes as Cathy
 Montserrat Lombard as Val
 Mariah Gale as Vanessa
 Michael Elwyn as Bertie

Production
In May 2018, it was announced Billie Piper would write, direct, and star in the film. In September 2018, it was announced that principal photography had commenced, with David Thewlis, Leo Bill and Kerry Fox joining the cast of the film. Filming took place in London, as well as Lloret de Mar, Catalonia, Spain.

Release
Rare Beasts had its world premiere at the Venice Film Festival on 31 August 2019. The film later screened at the London Film Festival and the Kerry Film Festival, both in October 2019. The film's North American premiere was scheduled to take place at South by Southwest in March 2020, however, the festival was cancelled as a result of the COVID-19 pandemic.

In February 2021, the film's first official trailer was released and distributor Republic Film Distribution earmarked its UK theatrical release for 7 May 2021. The film's release date was later revised to 21 May 2021, as government lockdown restrictions on indoor cinemas were lifted from 17 May in England, Scotland and Wales. The film received a limited release in 30 cinemas across the UK and was simultaneously made available to purchase and stream on Amazon Prime Video and the Google Play Store.

Reception
The review aggregator website Rotten Tomatoes surveyed  and, categorising the reviews as positive or negative, assessed 19 as positive and 13 as negative for  rating. The critics consensus reads "Billie Piper's admirably bold directorial vision isn't quite enough to counter Rare Beasts' frustratingly shallow treatment of its weightier themes."

Accolades

References

External links
 

2019 films
2019 directorial debut films
2019 drama films
British drama films
2010s English-language films
2010s British films